The Albatros C.XII was a German military reconnaissance aircraft which saw service during World War I. It differed markedly from previous Albatros C-type aircraft by adopting an elliptical-section fuselage similar to that of the Albatros D.V. The C.XII also featured a tailplane of reduced area, but it retained the wings of the earlier Albatros C.X.

Despite the aerodynamic advantages, no significant increase in performance was achieved over the C.X. Examples remained in service until the end of the War.

Operators

Luftstreitkräfte

Polish Air Force (postwar)

Police air squadron (postwar)

Specifications (C.XII)

References

 
 
 

Biplanes
Single-engined tractor aircraft
1910s German military reconnaissance aircraft
C.12
Aircraft first flown in 1917